Melaleucia obliquifasciata is a moth of the family Erebidae first described by George Hampson in 1896. It is known from south-central Sri Lanka.

There are probably multiple generations per year, with adults recorded in all months except January, February, October and December.

The wingspan is 12–15 mm. The forewing is broad and white, although there is a terminal line in some specimens marked by black interveinal dots. The hindwing is light greyish brown, with an indistinct discal spot.

References

Micronoctuini
Moths described in 1896